Sıraç Dilber is a Turkish scientist. NK cells are needed to fight against bacteria and cancerous tumours; but even when they are present, they cannot fight the disease effectively. Dilber and his team managed to increase the number of cells by 200 .

References
 http://www.siracdilber.com 

Turkish non-fiction writers
Turkish medical researchers
Living people
Year of birth missing (living people)
Place of birth missing (living people)